A Maori Maid's Love (Originally titled The Surveyor's Daughter) is a 1916 Australian silent film directed by Raymond Longford about an interracial romance between a white man and a Māori girl. It is considered a lost film as there are no known copies.

Plot
Graham, an unhappily married surveyor, goes on a job to New Zealand where he falls in love with a Maori woman. She becomes pregnant and dies in childbirth. Graham puts his daughter in the care of Maori Jack, who later kills Graham. However his daughter (Lottie Lyell) inherits his property and falls in love with a jackeroo called Jim.

Cast
Lottie Lyell
Raymond Longford
Kenneth Carlisle
Rawdon Blandford

Production
The film was shot on location in Rotorua and Auckland from August 1915, with finance from a Sydney company, Vita Film Corporation. It was the first of two films Longford and Lyell made in New Zealand, the other being The Mutiny of the Bounty (1916).

Release

Distribution difficulties
Longford was unable to secure a release for the film in New Zealand. He blamed this on the influence of "the Combine" of Australasian Films and Union Theatres, who dominated distribution and exhibition at the time. The film was given a limited release in Sydney at a cinema owned by Hubert and Caroline Pugliese.

Critical reception
The critic from the Sydney Sun called it "unquestionably the best moving picture produced up to date at this end of the world... there would be little need for importing films while Australia can make her own of such a standard."

The Motion Picture News said the film "certainly could not be classed as a masterpiece. Reduced to three reels it would make a good, pleasing feature. The subtitles in their present state are crude and need revision. Director Raymond Longford had a hard task when he posed the Maori maids before the camera and deserves credit for the results obtained."

Lottie Lyell edited the film for its British release.

Significance
The movie is generally agreed to be the first full-length New Zealand feature film.

References

External links

1910s New Zealand films
1916 films
Australian drama films
New Zealand drama films
Australian silent feature films
Australian black-and-white films
Films about interracial romance
Films directed by Raymond Longford
Films set in New Zealand
Films shot in New Zealand
Lost Australian films
1916 drama films
Lost New Zealand films
1916 lost films
Lost drama films
Films about Māori people
Silent drama films